Aquibacter zeaxanthinifaciens  is a Gram-negative, zeaxanthin-producing, strictly aerobic, rod-shaped and non-spore-forming bacterium from the genus Aquibacter which has been isolated from seawater near Taichung in Taiwan.

References 

Flavobacteria
Bacteria described in 2014